Thalassocyon bonus is a species of sea snail, a marine gastropod mollusk in the family Thalassocyonidae.

Description

Distribution

References

Thalassocyonidae
Gastropods described in 1960